Best Ai is the first greatest hits album by Japanese-American singer-songwriter Ai, released on September 16, 2009, by Island Records and Universal Sigma. The album was released in three editions: limited CD+DVD, CD only and "Arienai Price" (low-priced) editions. Best Ai debuted at number 2 on the daily Oricon albums chart but switched back and forth between number 1 and number 2 several times during its release week. The album went on to debut atop the weekly albums chart with 81,663 copies sold, beating the second-place holder Takeshi Tsuruno's Tsuruno Oto by merely 1,332 units and becoming her first number-one album.

The album is certified Platinum for shipment of 250,000 copies.

Track listing

Charts

Weekly charts

Monthly charts

Year-end charts

Certifications

See also 

 List of Oricon number-one albums of 2009

References

External links
 

2009 compilation albums
2009 greatest hits albums

Ai (singer) compilation albums
Island Records compilation albums
Universal Music Group compilation albums
Universal Sigma compilation albums